The Magasin du Nord Fashion Prize is awarded annually by the Magasin Foundation to an up and coming Danish fashion designer or brand. The winner receives DKK 300,000 and a fashion show during Copenhagen Fashion Week in February the following year.

History
The fashion award was first presented under the name Dansk Design Talent (Danish Design Talent) by the Magasin Foundation in 2013. The award was from 2015 rebranded in a partnership with the fashion magazine Dansk under the name Dansk Design Talent - Magasin Prisen. It changed its name to the Magasin du Nord Fashion Prize in 2017.

Selection process
The nominees are selected by a panel of Danish design business and branding specialists. The final winner is selected by an international jury based on criteria such as design, brand value and business plan.

Laureates and nominees

References

Danish fashion
Danish awards